This is the following episode list for Nick Jr.'s Olivia. The series ran for two seasons between 2009 and 2015.

Series overview

Episodes

Season 1 (2009–2010)

Season 2 (2010–2015)
In season 2, Ian is wearing a small planet on his T-shirt and he has a deeper voice and Francine, Daisy, Julian and Olivia's Mom have different voices. In season 1, Ian has a default shirt. Olivia's Mom has the same color clothes.

.

References

Episodes
Lists of American children's animated television series episodes
Lists of British animated television series episodes
Lists of Nickelodeon television series episodes